Stelis cuencana is a species of flowering plant in the family Orchidaceae, native to Ecuador.

References

cuencana
Flora of Ecuador